Nico Thomas Evers-Swindell is a New Zealand actor who portrayed Prince William in the 2011 Lifetime original film William & Kate. Previous roles include minor appearances in the 2010 film Edge of Darkness and the television crime drama Law & Order. He is a cousin of twice gold-winning Olympic rowing champions Caroline and Georgina Evers-Swindell.

He studied at Victoria University of Wellington, from where he graduated with a Bachelor of Commerce and Administration and a Bachelor of Laws in 2003.

In 2011, Evers-Swindell married American actress Megan Ferguson. He played Prince Kenneth on the series Grimm.

Filmography

Film

Television

Music videos

References

External links
 

21st-century New Zealand male actors
Living people
New Zealand expatriates in the United States
New Zealand male film actors
New Zealand male television actors
Victoria University of Wellington alumni
Year of birth missing (living people)